Circus was a Cleveland, Ohio-based power pop band active in the early- and mid-1970s. Their lone, self-titled album was released in 1973, and their single "Stop Wait & Listen" debuted at #91 on the Billboard Hot 100 charts on March 17 of that year.

Former members
 Mick Sabol - Guitars, vocals
 Phil Alexander - Vocals, keyboards
 Tommy Dobeck - Drums
 Frank Salle - Bass guitar
 Dan Hrdlicka - Guitars, vocals (1970-1973)
 Craig Balzer - Guitars, vocals (1973-1975)
 Bruce Balzer - Guitars, vocals (1973-1975)

References 

Musical groups established in 1970
Musical groups disestablished in 1975